Rot is a river of Baden-Württemberg, Germany. It is a left tributary of the Kocher. In order to distinguish it from similar named other rivers (some of then flowing quite nearby), this Rot is sometimes also called Fichtenberger Rot. Its source is near Wüstenrot, it passes through Oberrot, Fichtenberg and Unterrot, and flows into the Kocher near Gaildorf.

See also
List of rivers of Baden-Württemberg

References

Rivers of Baden-Württemberg
Mainhardt Forest
Rivers of Germany